Durgam Cheruvu, also known as Raidurgam Cheruvu, is a freshwater lake located in Rangareddy district, Jagathgiri Gutta Telangana, India. The lake is also known as Secret Lake because it is hidden between the localities of Jubilee Hills and Madhapur. The Durgam Cheruvu Bridge, which traverses the lake, was inaugurated in September 2020.

History 
Under the rule of the Qutub Shahi dynasty (ca. 1518–1687), this lake served as the drinking water source for the residents of Golkonda fort.

The lake front park was inaugurated on August 28, 2018 by Mr. K. T. Rama Rao

Tourism 
In 2001, the tourism department of the local government initiated steps to promote the lake as a tourist destination. As a part of this, five boats were to be deployed at the lake.

In 2002, the lake started to become a destination for people who go for fishing as a pastime. Few people from the nearby city of Hyderabad travel to this lake on the weekends to relax and enjoy fishing. To capitalise on the visitors, the local agencies expanded their tourism plans by turning the lake into a fishing zone. As a part of the various beautification steps, the area surrounding the lake was illuminated, artificial waterfalls, a rock garden and a floating fountain were added. In addition to this, proper seating arrangements, a  walkway and restaurants were established. Adventure activities like rock climbing, trekking, rappelling, an art gallery and a sculptor park for artists were also introduced as attractions. An amphitheater, with a capacity to hold 1,500 people at a time, was also added for public access.

In 2018, the lake bund was upgraded with walkways as part of CSR activity by K Raheja group.

Controversies and pollution 
Because of the unique rock formations abutting the lake, it was designated as a protected area. In 2001, the state high court issued an order to the local pollution board and the city's water supply and sewerage board not to allow development of new residential localities near the lake. Furthermore, the court order also asked these agencies to take immediate steps for prevention or collection and treatment of domestic sewage flowing into the lake from the residential colonies in the vicinity and catchment area of the lake. Despite these notifications, the local agencies have failed in controlling both pollution and illegitimate constructions on the lake bed.

To tackle pollution in the lake, sewage treatment plants were set up by the local pollution control board in 2006. As years passed by, the plant became non-functional.

Durgam Cheruvu is now a place to relax. There is an amphitheatre, and the On the Rocks cafeteria. Boating is also available. A cable bridge with dancing fountain also adorns the lake.

Gallery

References 

Lakes of Hyderabad, India
Reservoirs in Telangana